Dame Pearl Barbara Goodman  (née Robinson, 5 October 1932 – 21 June 2013) was an Auckland, New Zealand politician.

Early life and family
Born in Auckland on 5 October 1932, Goodman was educated at St Cuthbert's College. She married Harold Goodman in 1954, and the couple went on to have three children.

Political career
Goodman was mayoress of Auckland City during the mayoralty of her uncle Sir Dove-Myer Robinson, as well as an Auckland city councillor for 12 years. Her husband, Harold, was an Auckland City Councillor and he served as deputy mayor of Auckland City in the late 1970s. In 1973, she opened a therapeutic pool at Kingseat Hospital.

In the 1981 Queen's Birthday Honours, Goodman was appointed a Companion of the Queen's Service Order for community service.

Her husband died on 16 August 1988 and she succeeded him onto the council in a by-election, representing the Citizens and Ratepayers group. She championed causes including homosexual law reform, abortion rights, the volunteer movement and campaigned for the Odyssey House Trust for drug rehabilitation. She served as Odyssey House (Auckland)'s Chairperson, overseeing a range of specialist programmes for adolescents, parents, and other adults experiencing serious difficulties with substance abuse, gambling, and other associated problems. She was patron of Volunteering Auckland for many years. In 2006, she opposed the New Zealand government's plan to build a $500 million rugby stadium on Quay Street in Auckland's waterfront area.

In the 1989 New Year Honours, Goodman was appointed a Dame Commander of the Order of the British Empire, for services to the community.

Family
Goodman was the niece of former Auckland City mayor Sir Dove-Myer Robinson, in whose honour she spearheaded a memorial sculpture in Aotea Square, which was built in 2002. The sculpture celebrates the contribution "Robbie" made to the city.

Following Goodman's DBE in 1989, her cousin Lesley Max was made a Dame Commander of the New Zealand Order of Merit for services to children in the 2010 New Year Honours. It is understood to be the first time two Jewish cousins were both made dames.

Death
Goodman died in Auckland on 21 June 2013, aged 80, having suffered from Parkinson's disease for several years.

References

1932 births
2013 deaths
New Zealand Dames Commander of the Order of the British Empire
Jewish New Zealand politicians
Companions of the Queen's Service Order
New Zealand justices of the peace
Auckland City Councillors
New Zealand political hostesses
People from Auckland
People educated at St Cuthbert's College, Auckland